Amitava Raychaudhuri is an Indian theoretical particle physicist. He is Professor Emeritus at the Physics Department of the Science College, University of Calcutta where he earlier held the Sir Tarak Nath Palit Chair Professorship. He is the nephew of another renowned Indian physicist, Amal Kumar Raychaudhuri.

Early life and education
Raychaudhuri was born in Calcutta, India and did his schooling at the South Point School (India). He later attended Presidency College, Calcutta from where he obtained his BSc degree in Physics in 1970 and then went on to complete his MSc degree at Delhi University in 1973. Under the supervision of Oscar W. Greenberg, Raychaudhuri obtained his PhD degree in Particle Physics from the University of Maryland, College Park in 1977.

Research and career

After postdoctoral work at the University of Oxford and the Tata Institute of Fundamental Research, Mumbai he joined the Rajabazar Science College campus of University of Calcutta in 1980 as a lecturer in physics, where he became Reader and then the Sir Tarak Nath Palit Professor. During his tenure at the University of Calcutta, he was a Scientific Associate (1983–84) at CERN, Senior Indo-US Fulbright Fellow (1988–89) at the Lawrence Berkeley Laboratory and Senior Marie Curie Fellow (1994) at the University of Cambridge. He was also a Visiting Professor (1998) at the Oklahoma State University. He was the Director of the Harish-Chandra Research Institute, Allahabad from 2005 to 2011 after which he rejoined the University of Calcutta as faculty.

Raychaudhuri has worked in diverse areas within particle physics encompassing quantum chromodynamics, grand unified theories, classical solutions, left-right symmetric models, FCNC, supersymmetry, neutrino physics, extra dimensions, etc. He made pioneering contributions in CP-violation in supersymmetric models, the possibility of parity restoration at relatively low energies, neutrino masses and mixing in supersymmetric and other models, long baseline neutrino experiments, besides making a brief but important foray in the foundations of quantum mechanics. He holds a reputation of a charismatic teacher among his students.

Awards and achievements
He was the recipient of the INSA Young Scientist Award in 1982, the Shanti Swarup Bhatnagar Prize for Science and Technology, the highest science award in India, in the physical sciences category in 1997, the J.C. Bose fellowship, the National Merit Certificate and Prize and the National Science Talent Search Scholarship in 1967. He is a Fellow of the Indian National Science Academy, National Academy of Sciences, Allahabad and the Indian Academy of Sciences, Bangalore. He was also a two-term senior associate of the Abdus Salam International Centre for Theoretical Physics (ICTP), Trieste, Italy. In 2005, Raychaudhuri was conferred the honour of International Alumnus of the Year by the University of Maryland Alumni Association. He is a recipient of D.Sc. (honoris causa) from the University of Gour Banga and the University of North Bengal.

Notes

References

External links
 Amitava Raychudhuri's list of publications on INSPIRE-HEP
 Amitava Raychudhuri's Home Page at HRI
 Amitava Raychudhuri's INSA Page
 University of Calcutta: High Energy Physics Group Page

Living people
1952 births
20th-century Indian physicists
Indian particle physicists
Bengali physicists
University of Maryland, College Park alumni
Indian theoretical physicists
Academic staff of the University of Calcutta
People associated with CERN
Fellows of the Indian National Science Academy
Fellows of the Indian Academy of Sciences
Fellows of The National Academy of Sciences, India
Scientists from Kolkata